Christopher Frederick Evelyn Goldie (born 2 November 1960 in Johannesburg, Transvaal, South Africa) is a retired South African born English cricketer. Goldie was a right-handed batsman who played primarily as a wicketkeeper.

Educated at St Paul's School London, Goldie made his first-class debut for Cambridge University against local rivals Essex in 1981. During 1981 Goldie would play ten first-class matches. In the university match at Lords in 1981, Goldie scored 77 for Cambridge having gone in as Nightwatchman. Also in 1981 he represented a combined Oxford University and Cambridge University side against the touring Sri Lankans. In 1982 Goldie made nine first-class matches for Cambridge, the last of which came against rival university Oxford. It was also during 1982 that Goldie made his one-day debut for the Combined Universities in the group stages of the 1982 Benson and Hedges Cup.

In 1983 Goldie signed for Hampshire, making his debut for the club against the touring New Zealanders. Goldie would never play in the County Championship, but would play two more matches against the touring Sri Lankans in 1984 and Oxford University in 1985. At the end of the 1986 season Goldie left Hampshire. In 1987 Goldie kept wicket for the Duchess of Norfolk's XI against the Rest of the World side gathered in England for the Bicentenary celebrations of the MCC. In 1991, he also toured Australia and Hong Kong with the Club Cricket Conference.

Sixteen years after making his last senior cricket appearance Goldie represented the Middlesex Cricket Board in the 2001 stages of the 2002 Cheltenham & Gloucester Trophy against Scotland.

Goldie is currently the Chairman of the Middlesex Cricket Trust and Richmond Cricket Club in Surrey, where he played for many years. In 1989, he captained a young Adam Gilchrist who spent the summer playing for Richmond.

He has served several terms as a member of the Middlesex Cricket's executive board and Chairman of the Middlesex Cricket Trust.

External links
Chris Goldie on Cricinfo

1960 births
Living people
Cricketers from Johannesburg
English cricketers
Cambridge University cricketers
Hampshire cricketers
Middlesex Cricket Board cricketers
Oxford and Cambridge Universities cricketers
British Universities cricketers
English cricketers of 1946 to 1968
English cricketers of 1969 to 2000